Mayor of Kingstown is an American crime thriller television series created by Taylor Sheridan and Hugh Dillon. The series premiered on November 14, 2021, on Paramount+. In February 2022, the series was renewed for a second season which premiered on January 15, 2023.

Premise 
Kingstown, Michigan is a company town where the business is incarceration. The McLusky family have been keeping the peace in Kingstown for decades, acting as the moderators between the street gangs, prisoners, guards, and the cops. Tackling themes of systemic racism, corruption, and inequality, the series provides a stark look at their attempt to bring order and justice to a town that has neither.

Cast

Main 
 Jeremy Renner as Mike McLusky, starting off as right-hand man for his older brother Mitch, Mike takes over as "Mayor" after Mitch's death in the first episode. The middle McLusky brother, Mike spent his whole childhood dreaming of getting out of Kingstown. Later in the season, we learn that Mike was once an inmate in the Kingstown prison and rose to the rank of "Shot-Caller" for the White inmates.
 Dianne Wiest as Mariam McLusky, the matriarch of the McLusky brothers. Mariam is a college professor who volunteers teaching inmates in the female prison. Miriam is fully aware of the activities that her sons take part in and has a deep animosity towards Mike.
 Hugh Dillon as Ian Ferguson, a seasoned, hard-nosed detective for the Kingstown Police Department and Kyle's partner.
 Tobi Bamtefa as Deverin "Bunny" Washington, leader of the Crips in Kingstown, Bunny spends his days sitting on a lawn chair selling drugs he has in coolers next to him out in the open. Bunny has a good relationship with Mike and is the closest thing to a friend that Mike has.
 Taylor Handley as Kyle McLusky, the youngest of the McLusky brothers. Kyle is a detective for the Kingstown Police Department. Kyle often battles with the choices he is forced to make assisting his two older brothers with their business dealings, as well as the questionable tactics his fellow officers employ on suspects. As a way to distance himself from the mayhem and corruption of working in Kingstown, Kyle is close to getting a transfer to the Michigan State Police. Kyle is also married to Tracy and is expecting their first son. In Season 2 Kyle is currently working as a Michigan State Trooper but after a police involved shooting which results in the death of his partner and orphaning a young toddler, Kyle is overcome with trauma and guilt affecting his relationship with his wife.
 Emma Laird as Iris, a smooth-talking escort who works for Milo and the Russian mafia to seduce and bribe government officials. Iris is originally brought into Kingstown in an attempt to control Mike.
 Derek Webster as Stevie, a detective for the Kingstown Police Department and another ally to the McLusky brothers.
 Hamish Allan-Headley as Robert Sawyer, a police sergeant that leads an elite team of Kingstown SWAT officers. Robert is a force of nature who isn't afraid to do whatever is necessary to get the job done, which includes operating his team as more of a death squad. A former Army Special Forces soldier who deployed to Afghanistan, Robert is also the father of a young son.
 Pha'rez Lass as P-Dog (season 1), A "Shot-Caller" and leader of the Crip inmates in the Kingstown Prison. P-Dog leads a prison riot for retaliation against the guards for their ill treatment. P-Dog is eventually killed in the Season 1 finale by Michigan National Guardsmen.
 Aidan Gillen as Milo Sunter, a Russian mobster who is spending life in prison after killing guards during an armored car robbery.
 Kyle Chandler as Mitch McLusky (season 1), the oldest of the McLusky brothers, Mitch took over the role of "Mayor" after their father, the original "Mayor", died.
 Nishi Munshi as Tracy McLusky (season 2; recurring season 1), Kyle's wife, who is pregnant with their son

Recurring 
 James Jordan as Ed Simmons (Season 1), a corrections sergeant who helps coordinate with Mike and Mitch in dealing with the inmates. Ed is killed in the Season 1 finale by P-Dog.
 Nichole Galicia as Rebecca, who works as a secretary for Mitch and then later for Mike
 Andrew Howard as Duke, leader of a White Supremacist Gang, who also controls the White inmates inside the prison. Duke once served time alongside Mike in the Kingstown Prison, both as acting "Shot Callers". Duke is killed towards the end of Season 1 by Mike in retaliation for abusing Iris.
 Jose Pablo Cantillo as Carlos Jiménez, A high-ranking leader in the Mexican Mafia. Carlos also served time with Mike in the Kingstown prison back when he was a "Shot-Caller" for the whites.
 Michael Beach as Captain Kareem Moore, leader of the Kingstown prison guards. During Season 2 Kareem was promoted as interim Warden of the Kingstown Prison.
 Necar Zadegan as Evelyn Foley, assistant district attorney for the City of Kingstown, who is, secretly, having an affair with Mike
 Jason Kelley as Tim Weaver, a corrections officer who also helps Mike and Mitch.
 Mandela Van Peebles as Sam, Tim's nephew, and a rookie corrections officer, whose actions cause chaos within and outside the prison
 Rob Kirkland as Captain Walter, captain of police in the Kingstown Police Department
 Rob Stewart as Captain Richard Heard, captain of detectives in the Kingstown Police Department
 Natasha Marc as Cherry, a young 20-year-old inmate in the female prison and one of Miriam's students
 Stacie Greenwell as Abby Steele, a seasoned corrections officer assigned to the female prison
 George Tchortov as Joseph, Milo's right-hand man and leader of the Russian Mafia operating in Kingstown. It is revealed in season 2 that Joseph was secretly having an affair with Tatiana behind Milo's back, resulting in them having a child together.
 Gratiela Brancusi as Tatiana (season 2) Another escort that works for Milo and the Russian Mafia. She is also a mother of Joseph's child.
 Lane Garrison as Carney (season 2) A Kingstown Prison Guard who takes over the role that his predecessor Ed Simmons filled after his death.

Episodes

Series overview

Season 1 (2021–22)

Season 2 (2023)

Production 
The project was first announced in January 2020, when Paramount Network ordered the series. By February 2021, the series was transferred over to the Paramount+ streaming service, with Jeremy Renner cast to star. The next month, Dianne Wiest joined the cast, with Emma Laird, Derek Webster and Taylor Handley added in April. Series co-creator Hugh Dillon joined the cast alongside Pha'rez Lass and Tobi Bamtefa in May. Kyle Chandler was revealed to have joined the cast in August following the release of a teaser poster for the series, while Aidan Gillen and Hamish Allan-Headley were added to the main cast. On February 1, 2022, Paramount+ renewed the series for a second season.

Filming on the first season took place from May 17 to October 4, 2021, at Stratagem Studios in Toronto,  Hamilton, Ontario, Burlington, Ontario and in Kingston, Ontario, mainly the Kingston Penitentiary.

In June 2022, filming for the second season took place at the Lampe Marina and Presque Isle Bay near Erie, Pennsylvania.

Andrew Lockington composed the music for the series. Lakeshore Records has released the soundtrack.

Release 
The 10-episode first season of Mayor of Kingstown premiered on November 14, 2021, on Paramount+. The first two episodes had their linear premiere on November 21 and 28, 2021 on Paramount Network, where it was originally supposed to air. The second season premiered on January 15, 2023, on Paramount+.

Reception 

The review aggregator website Rotten Tomatoes reports a 32% approval rating with an average rating of 5.8/10, based on 25 critic reviews. The website's critics consensus reads, "Despite campaigning with a strong pedigree, Mayor of Kingstown botches its reelection chances by giving constituents too much gloom and grit and not enough reasons to care." Metacritic, which uses a weighted average, assigned a score of 54 out of 100 based on 15 critics, indicating "mixed or average reviews".

During its debut in the US, which was simulcast on cable as a means of promotion, the series drew 2.6 million viewers linearly, making it Paramount Network's most-watched scripted premiere since 2018.

References

External links 
 
 
 

2021 American television series debuts
2020s American crime drama television series
2020s prison television series
English-language television shows
American prison television series
American thriller television series
Crips
Gangs in fiction
Paramount+ original programming
Television series about families
Television series created by Taylor Sheridan
Television shows filmed in Kingston, Ontario
Television shows filmed in Hamilton, Ontario
Television shows filmed in Pennsylvania
Television shows filmed in Toronto
Television shows set in Michigan
Films shot in Erie, Pennsylvania
Works about gangs
Works about the Russian Mafia